Denise Austin (née Katnich; born February 13, 1957) is an American fitness instructor, author, and columnist, and a former member of the President's Council on Physical Fitness and Sports.

Early life
Austin was born in San Pedro, Los Angeles, California. She started gymnastics at the age of 12, which led to an athletic scholarship at the University of Arizona.

Personal life
Denise is married to sports agent and former tennis player Jeff Austin, brother of US Open champion Tracy Austin. They have been married since April 30, 1983, and have two daughters, Kelly (b. 1990) and Katie (b. 1993). Katie is a fitness instructor like her mother and has her own YouTube channel. As of 2012, the Austins resided in Alexandria, Virginia. In 2018, the Austins moved to Hermosa Beach, California.

Fitness career
Austin initially attended the University of Arizona on a gymnastics scholarship, reaching the rank of number 9 in the NCAA on balance beam. She later transferred to California State University, Long Beach, graduating with a bachelor's degree in physical education, and a minor in exercise physiology.

Since then, she has been teaching classes, producing fitness shows, creating exercise video tapes, and writing books and columns on exercise and staying fit. Examples include Shrink Your Female Fat Zones, Pilates for Every Body, and Eat Carbs, Lose Weight. In 2002, president George W. Bush named Austin as a member of the President's Council on Physical Fitness and Sports, and began her second term in 2006.

Austin promoted the Reebok Freestyle sneaker, which was the first athletic shoe designed for women, making it an instant hit in the gym in the 1980s. "I absolutely loved this time in my career, I was the first spokesperson for the very first aerobic shoe," Austin said in a November, 22, 2019 Facebook post.

Austin is known for her emphasis on staying fit naturally, emphasizing that she herself exercises only about 30 minutes a day and does not skip meals. She also prefers the use of sugar and butter over artificial sweeteners and margarine, though she does emphasize portion control, proper nutrient balance, and exercise. Austin supports a balanced program of exercise and proper diet, and encourages people to stay away from fad diets or "crazy claims" for quick fixes. Her exercise programs often integrate a variety of methods including yoga, pilates, cross training, and aerobic exercise.

Austin had a long-running exercise television program Getting Fit with Denise Austin on ESPN2, reruns of which can currently be seen on ESPN Classic and Altitude Sports and Entertainment. The show moved to weekday mornings on Lifetime Television, where it was renamed Fit and Lite and Denise Austin's Daily Workout. Austin produced these shows each fall, spending four months on location in resorts in the Caribbean and Arizona. Lifetime cancelled the shows in April 2008. Austin said she was developing a new TV show later that year. It was in the planning stages for 2010. 

According to The Washington Post, Austin was headed back to Lifetime in January 2011. She is on the morning program The Balancing Act. Austin before had said on her website that she was getting a new show ready for debut in the fall of 2008, though the show did not debut. When she was interviewed by Erin Whitehead in 2009, it was reported her new show would be back on in the fall of that year. In April 2007 a Washington, DC alternative weekly newspaper called the Washington City Paper featured an article on Austin under their "Cheap Seats" column, where she was questioned about how some of her exercise shows on YouTube are like pornography to some people. Austin said that she was totally unaware. She also reportedly said, with a giggle, that she was worried about it.

List of workout videos

References

External links
Official site

Denise Austin Fan at Blogger (service)

1957 births
Living people
American columnists
American women columnists
American exercise and fitness writers
American exercise instructors
American gymnasts
Television personalities from Los Angeles
American women television personalities
Arizona Wildcats women's gymnasts
California State University, Long Beach alumni
California Republicans
Writers from Alexandria, Virginia
Writers from Los Angeles
Journalists from Virginia